Pallas and the Centaur is a painting by the Italian Renaissance painter Sandro Botticelli, c. 1482. It is now in the Uffizi Gallery in Florence.  It has been proposed as a companion piece to his Primavera, though it is a different shape.  The medium used is tempera paints on canvas and its size is 207 x 148 cm.  The painting has been retouched in many places, and these retouchings have faded.

The life-size figures are from classical mythology and probably form an allegory.  There is a centaur on the left, and a female figure holding a very elaborate halberd on the right. She is clutching the centaur's hair, and he seems submissive to her.  The female figure was called Camilla in the earliest record of the painting, an inventory of 1499, but then in an inventory of 1516 she is called Minerva, the Roman equivalent of Pallas Athene, which remains her usual identification in recent times, although Camilla has supporters. Arthur Frothingham suggested that she is Florencia, the personification of the city of Florence.

Camilla was a figure from specifically Roman mythology (if not just invented by Virgil for the Aeneid), a princess raised in the forest by her father, the exiled King Metabus, to be dedicated to Diana as a virgin warrior huntress, for whom subduing a centaur might be considered all in a day's work.  Pallas/Minerva, by contrast, is a major deity, goddess of wisdom, trade and much else.  Centaurs are associated with uncontrolled passion, lust and sensuality, and at least part of the meaning of the painting is clearly about the submission of passion to chastity and/or reason.  Various more specific personal, political and philosophical meanings along these general lines have been proposed.

The fine cloth of Pallas' clinging dress is decorated with the three ring insignia of the Medici family, confirming that the painting was made for the Medici family.  She wears either olive branches (the tree of Pallas) or laurel sprays, entwined around her head, arms, breasts and hips held together by diamant rings similar to those forming the Medici sign; laurel was often used as a punning allusion to Lorenzo de' Medici.  On her back is a shield and she wears leather sandals on her feet. The ceremonial halberd, especially in such large and elaborate form, was a weapon carried by guards rather than on the battlefield, and the centaur has apparently been arrested while preparing to shoot his bow.

History 
The painting is usually dated to about 1482 or 1483 on stylistic grounds, soon after Botticelli's return from Rome, where he had been part of the project to paint the Sistine Chapel.  The features of the centaur are close to those of Moses in one of his frescos there.  The painting is often connected with the wedding in 1482 of Lorenzo di Pierfrancesco de' Medici to Semiramide Appiano, perhaps as a wedding gift from Lorenzo de' Medici (Lorenzo il Magnifico").

Given the Medici device on Pallas' dress, it was presumably commissioned by the Medici family, as were many of Botticelli’s paintings, and has passed to the Uffizi with much of their collection.  In 1499 an inventory lists it in the same room as Botticelli's Primavera, in the town palace in Florence of Lorenzo di Pierfrancesco de' Medici and his brother Giovanni "Il Popolano".  They were the cousins of Lorenzo de' Medici, de facto ruler of Florence, and after their father's early death had been his wards.  In the later 16th century it hung in the Palazzo Vecchio.  In 1638 it was at the Medici Villa di Castello, as was the Primavera, then it is recorded in the Pitti Palace by about 1830, by which time Botticelli was unfashionable and regarded as mainly of historical interest.

The painting was then little-known until it was noticed in 1895 in one of the ante-rooms of the Palazzo Pitti by the English artist, living in Florence, William Blundell Spence.  The painting was in the Uffizi gallery from 1922.  It has perhaps been transferred from panel to canvas.

In 2015, this painting among other Botticelli paintings was in an exhibition that opened in Berlin before moving to London. It showed Botticelli’s works and other artists’ versions of his paintings such as his The Birth of Venus.

Linda Proud has written an eponymous novel which centres on an account of Botticelli's creation of this painting, and its possible interpretations.

Interpretations 

If given by Lorenzo de' Medici for his cousin's wedding, the two figures may represent the couple, aside from any other interpretations.  The lands of the bride's father, lord of Piombino on the Ligurian coast, and the island of Elba just off it, might be considered as part of Camilla's hunting grounds. The Italian for the balls in the Medici coat of arms is palle, and their supporters were sometimes called palleschi, which adds to the plausibility of political interpretations.

Pallas is a figure of reason, restraining the beast of our nature – also represented by the centaur – by the hair and looking at it with no fear. This has been connected with Sigmund Freud’s theory of the unconscious, and also to the Renaissance Neo-Platonist Marsilio Ficino's idea of the human soul as part animal and part human.   It has been interpreted as an allegory on the peace after the Pazzi wars.

Frothingham posited that Botticelli’s idea for the painting could have come from an image in the Chronography of 354, a Roman calendar by Furius Dionysius Filocalus, the secretary to Pope Damasus I. The calendar depicts the personification of the city of Trier as a female warrior with a spear and shield holding the hair of a male figure with a bow and arrows by his feet. The male is smaller than the female and looks as if he is trying to escape her grasp. The two works are very similar and it is possible Botticelli got his idea for his painting from this image, having seen a copy.

Drawings

There are three drawings in Botticelli's style of Pallas, which may possibly be early ideas for the painting, though none are very close to the final figure, and all seem to be studies for a single standing figure.  In two she carries a large olive branch and holds a helmet.  They are in the Uffizi, the Ashmolean Museum in Oxford, and the Pinacoteca Ambrosiana in Milan.

Notes

References

Ettlinger, Leopold with Helen S. Ettlinger, Botticelli, 1976, Thames and Hudson (World of Art), 
Frothingham, A. L., "The Real Title of Botticelli's "Pallas"", American Journal of Archaeology 12/4, Oct.-Dec. 1908: 438–444. . .
Hartt, Frederick, History of Italian Renaissance Art, (2nd ed.) 1987, Thames & Hudson (U.S.: Harry N. Abrams), 
Legouix, Susan, Botticelli, 2004 (rev. ed.), Chaucer Press, 
Lightbown, Ronald, Sandro Botticelli: Life and Work, 1989 (rev. ed.), Thames and Hudson

External links
Web Gallery of Art

1480s paintings
Paintings by Sandro Botticelli in the Uffizi
Paintings depicting Greek myths
Ships in art